River Cottage Spring is a Channel 4 programme that follows Hugh Fearnley-Whittingstall at his Dorset home and teaching school River Cottage throughout the spring of 2008, harvesting crops, cooking organic food, teaching families to be smallholders and challenging Tesco against the source its chicken products.

List of episodes

References

External links
 

Channel 4 original programming
2008 British television series debuts
2008 British television series endings